Tessellana tessellata known as the brown-spotted bush-cricket is a European and North African insect in the tribe Platycleidini (Tettigoniidae).

Subspecies
Orthoptera Species File lists two subspecies:
 T. tessellata holoptera 
 T. tessellata tessellata

References

Tettigoniinae
Orthoptera of Europe